Maksym Zvonov (till 2020 - Pustozvonov; born April 16, 1987) is a Ukrainian professional basketball player. He represents the Ukrainian national basketball team.

Professional career

Ukraine
Born in Bila Tserkva, Zvonov began his basketball career in the Ukrainian Basketball SuperLeague, first with the second division team became a champion  and then first division of BC Kyiv from 2004 to 2010. In 2010 was nominated “Best progressive player of the league “

From 2010 to 2011 he played for BC Azovmash.Was named the best player of the round 6 in VTB league.

In 2011, he joined the team of BC Donetsk, where he spent two seasons and become a champion of Ukrainian National Super league.

In 2013, he came back to BC Azovmash for one year.

In August 2014, he signed with the BC Budivelnyk for the 2014–2015 season.

In March 2015, he was named the Ukrainian Cup MVP, after beating Dnipro in Final with Budivelnyk.

In September 2018, he signed with the BC Dynamo Odesa for the 2018–2019 season.With him Odessa advanced to the Cup Final and he was shooting over 50% from 3 point line  in the National championship (best in a league)

In August 2019, he signed with the Kyiv-Basket for the 2019–2020 season.And again finished the season with the best percentage in league from 3 point line(over 48%).

In January 2021, he signed with the BC Budivelnyk and will play under the new name of Zvonov. With Zvonov BC Budivelnik become a National Cup winner.

During his career 5 times he was selected for National super league All Star Games .In 2020 won the three points contest.

Romania
In October 2015, Zvonov signed with the BCM U Pitești for the 2015–2016 season.Where he finished his season as a best 3 point shooter of the National league with over 56%!

In the 2016–17 season he played for Romanian team U BT Cluj-Napoca and won the SuperCup, Cup and the National Championship.

NBA G-League
On November 21, 2017, Zvonov was acquired by the Memphis Hustle. Almost immediately he was exchanged for the Canton Charge. He played for the Canton Charge in the NBA G League till March 2018.

National team career
Zvonov was a member of the Ukrainian national basketball team at the 2014 FIBA Basketball World Cup, EuroBasket 2011,EuroBasket 2013, EuroBasket 2015, EuroBasket 2017.

Coaching career
In summer 2022, Zvonov was a part of Cleveland Cavaliers training camp as an assistant coach.

Personal life
Zvonov married Lana Kaufman on April 2022. The couple has one son, Lev (b. November 6, 2020). Lana Kaufman also has three children from a previous relationship,

References

1987 births
Living people
BC Azovmash players
BC Budivelnyk players
BC Donetsk players
BC Kyiv players
Canton Charge players
CS Universitatea Cluj-Napoca (men's basketball) players
CSU Pitești players
People from Bila Tserkva
Power forwards (basketball)
Small forwards
Ukrainian expatriate basketball people in the United States
Ukrainian expatriate sportspeople in Romania
Ukrainian men's basketball players
2014 FIBA Basketball World Cup players
Sportspeople from Kyiv Oblast